Marie-France Dubreuil (born August 11, 1974) is a Canadian ice dancing coach and former competitor. With her husband Patrice Lauzon, she is a two-time (2006–2007) World silver medallist.

Personal life 
Marie-France Dubreuil was born on August 11, 1974, in Montreal, Quebec. She married her Canadian partner and skater Patrice Lauzon in August 2008. On December 24, 2010, she gave birth to their daughter, Billie-Rose.

Competitive career 
When Dubreuil was five, she asked for skating lessons for her birthday and her grandmother gave her skates as a present. She took up ice dancing at the age of ten. The pair of Ekaterina Gordeeva / Sergei Grinkov was one of her influences. Competing with Bruno Yvars, she won the bronze medal at 1990 World Junior Championships.

Dubreuil teamed up with Patrice Lauzon in 1995 and they placed 6th at their first Canadian Championships. They took the silver medal in their first appearance at Four Continents in 2000. Their coaches were Sylvie Fullum and François Vallee, who retired after the 2001–02 season. Dubreuil/Lauzon decided to move permanently to Lyon, France, to train under Muriel Boucher-Zazoui.

Dubreuil/Lauzon captured the gold medal at the Canadian National Championships five times and competed at the Winter Olympics twice. They had to withdraw from the 2006 Winter Olympics after Dubreuil suffered an injury from a fall during a lift attempt at the end of a program. Lauzon had to carry her off the ice. They recovered to win the silver medal at the 2006 World Championships in Calgary, Alberta.

Dubreuil/Lauzon began the 2006–07 season with gold medals at 2006 Skate Canada International and 2006 NHK Trophy, which qualified them for the Grand Prix Final. At the World Championships in Tokyo, they took their second consecutive World silver medal.

Dubreuil/Lauzon skated in ice shows in the 2007–08 season. They confirmed their retirement from competitive skating on May 20, 2008.

Dubreuil appeared on the CBC Television series Battle of the Blades, in which figure skaters are paired with ice hockey players in a figure skating competition. She and her season 1 partner Stéphane Richer finished in third place. She took season 2 off because she was pregnant. During the show's third season, she was paired with Bryan Berard.

Coaching career 
Dubreuil and Lauzon coach ice dancing at the Gadbois Centre in Montreal with Romain Haguenauer. Their current students include:

 Gabriella Papadakis / Guillaume Cizeron (Olympic gold medalists,olympic silver medalists, European champions, Five-time World Champions, Three-time French National Champions)
 Laurence Fournier Beaudry / Nikolaj Sørensen (Two-time Danish National Champions and 2019 Canadian bronze-medallists.)
 Madison Hubbell / Zachary Donohue (2022 Olympic bronze medalists, Four Continents Champions, Grand Prix Final Champions, U.S. National Champions)
 Madison Chock / Evan Bates (Two-time Four Continents Champions, Three-time U.S. National Champions)
 Kaitlin Hawayek / Jean-Luc Baker (Four Continents Champions)
 Marie-Jade Lauriault / Romain Le Gac
 Olivia Smart / Adrià Díaz (Spanish National Champions)
 Carolane Soucisse / Shane Firus
 Marjorie Lajoie / Zachary Lagha (World Junior Champions)
Rikako Fukase / Oliver Zhang
 Lilah Fear / Lewis Gibson (British National Champions)
 Shiyue Wang / Xinyu Liu
Misato Komatsubara / Tim Koleto*
Jérémie Flemin / Justyna Plutowska
Allison Reed / Saulius Ambrulevičius

*Komatsubara and Koleto will split their time between Canada and Japan to enable Koleto to gain Japanese citizenship.
  
Their former students include:

 Tessa Virtue / Scott Moir (Three-time Olympic gold medalists, Two-time Olympic silver medalists, Three-time World Champions, Grand Prix Final Champions, Three-time Four Continents Champions, World Junior Champions, Junior Grand Prix Final Champions, Eight-time Canadian National Champions, Only ice dancers to achieve career grand slam)
Sara Hurtado / Adrià Díaz
Lee Ho-jung / Richard Kang-in Kam
Élisabeth Paradis / François-Xavier Ouellette
Alexandra Paul / Mitchell Islam
Celia Robledo / Luis Fenero
Ellie Fisher / Simon-Pierre Malette-Paquette 
Rikako Fukase / Aru Tateno

Programs 
(with Lauzon)

{|class=wikitable style=text-align:center
! Season
! Original dance
! Free dance
! Exhibition
|-
! 2006–07  
|
 Paya d'Ora 
|
 At Last 
|
 Ne Me Quitte Pas 

 Whole Lotta Love  
|-
! 2005–06  
| Salsa and rhumba:
 Ne Me Quitte Pas (remix) 
|
 Somewhere in Time 
|
 Ne Me Quitte Pas 

 Singing in the Rain 
|-
! 2004–05  
|
 Singin' in the Rain 
|
 Winter Vision 
 Taboo 
|
 Singing in the Rain 
|-
! 2003–04  
|
 Americano 
 Why Don't You Do Right
|
 Des Tours De Vies (Nu Tango) 
 Santa Maria (del Buen Ayre)  
 Vuelvo Al Sur  
 Tango Inna Babylone (Nu Tango) 
|
 L'Oiseau
 Glory Box 
|-
! 2002–03  
|
 At the Ball
 Furioso Polka 
|
 Dance with my Heart 
|
 Tango medley
|-
! 2001–02  
|
 Yo Soy Maria
 Balada Renga Para Un Organito Loco
 Yo Soy Maria 
|
 Madame Butterfly 
|
|-
! 2000–01  
|
 L-O-V-E 
 My Melancholy Baby 
|
 Victorious Titus 
|
 The Ninth Gate
|-
! 1999–2000  
|
 Relax and Mambo (Machito)
 Magalenha
 Dance with Me
|
 Life Is Beautiful 
|
 The First Time Ever I Saw Your Face 
 The Feeling Begins 
|-
! 1998–99  
|
 La Grimas Y Sonisas
 Argentine Waltz
|
 The Feeling Begins 
|
|}

 Results GP: Champions Series / Grand Prix''

With Lauzon

With Morbacher

With Yvars

References

External links 

1974 births
Canadian female ice dancers
Olympic figure skaters of Canada
Figure skaters at the 2002 Winter Olympics
Figure skaters at the 2006 Winter Olympics
Living people
Figure skaters from Montreal
Battle of the Blades participants
World Figure Skating Championships medalists
Four Continents Figure Skating Championships medalists
World Junior Figure Skating Championships medalists
Season-end world number one figure skaters